"Beautiful" is a song recorded by Australian singer Jessica Mauboy for her third studio album of the same name. The song was released for digital download on 22 November 2013, as the third single from the album. "Beautiful" was written by Mauboy, Charles Hinshaw, Chaz Mishan and David Delazyn, and produced by The Fliptones. Upon its release, "Beautiful" peaked at number 46 on the ARIA Singles Chart.

Production
"Beautiful" was written by Jessica Mauboy, Charles Hinshaw, Chaz Mishan and David Delazyn, and produced by The Fliptones. The Fliptones also handled the programming and keys. Mauboy's vocals were recorded at Rondor/Universal Recording Studio. "Beautiful" was engineered by Stuart Schenk and mixed by James Royo. It was mastered by Tom Coyne at Sterling Sound in New York City. According to Janelle Tucknott of Renowned for Sound, the song features "heavy bass notes" and its instrumentation is provided by an electronic keyboard. "Beautiful" was made available for digital purchase on 22 November 2013.

Reception
Janelle Tucknott of Renowned for Sound awarded "Beautiful" three-and-a-half stars out of five and wrote that "it's upbeat and catchy and begs to be played loudly while getting ready for a night out." Tucknott also described "Beautiful" as "the perfect Summer club track" and predicted it to be another hit for Mauboy. Jana Angeles of the same publication wrote that "Beautiful" is "an addictive track that is bound to be stuck in your head for days on end." She also noted that the song has "a summer lovin' feel" that would make "a perfect atmosphere for beaches and sunny weather." Entertainment Hive's Honey B described "Beautiful" as a "melodic high-energy number." The song debuted at number 66 on the ARIA Singles Chart dated 9 December 2013. The following week, it moved up to its peak position of number 46.

Music video
The music video for "Beautiful" was directed by Tony Prescott and produced by Jane Griffin. It was uploaded to Mauboy's Vevo account on 4 December 2013. The video features intercut scenes of Mauboy singing in front of a backdrop of water and against a black backdrop. Other intercut scenes include Mauboy and her love interest in the kitchen making food, a group of people washing a car, children running with balloons, and a couple celebrating a birthday.

Track listing
Digital download
 "Beautiful" – 3:12

Credits and personnel
Credits adapted from the liner notes of Beautiful.
Locations
Recorded at Rondor/Universal Recording Studio
Mastered at Sterling Sound in New York City.

Personnel
Songwriting – Jessica Mauboy, Charles Hinshaw, Chaz Mishan, David Delazyn
Production – The Fliptones
Mixing – James Royo
Engineering – Stuart Schenk
Mastering – Tom Coyne

Charts

Release history

References

2013 songs
2013 singles
Jessica Mauboy songs
Songs written by Jessica Mauboy
Sony Music Australia singles
Song recordings produced by the Fliptones